Semyon Sergeyevich Slepakov (born 23 August 1979 in Pyatigorsk) is a Russian producer, screenwriter and show-runner.

Biography 

Slepakov was born on August 23, 1979, in Pyatigorsk, Stavropol Krai. He graduated from the Faculty of Foreign Languages of Pyatigorsk State University with specialization in Translation from French. In 2003, he obtained the degree of Candidate of Economic Sciences.

Since 2005, he has been living in Moscow.

Filmography

As actor 
 2010 — Our Russia. The Balls of Fate
 2020 — Dead Souls
 2021 — BOOMERang

As playwright 
 2008 — Univer
 2010 — Our Russia. The Balls of Fate
 2018 —

References

External links
slepakov.com 

slepakov.ru

1979 births
21st-century Russian singers
Living people
Russian male comedians
People from Pyatigorsk
Russian screenwriters
Male screenwriters
Russian bards
Russian Jews
Russian humorists
Jewish humorists
Russian National Music Award winners